Cape Coast Municipal Council is a former district council that was located in Central Region, Ghana. Originally created as a municipal council in 1975. However on 1988, it was split off into two new district assemblies: Cape Coast Municipal District (capital: Cape Coast) and Komenda/Edina/Eguafo/Abirem District (capital: Elmina). The municipal council was located in the southwest part of Central Region and had Cape Coast as its capital town.

References

Central Region (Ghana)

Districts of the Central Region (Ghana)